Keekle Viaduct is a former railway viaduct near Keekle, Cumbria, England.

Context
The viaduct is a substantial structure which carried the double-track C&WJR's  to  via  main line over the River Keekle.

Opened in 1879, it consists of seven equal stone arches across the river.

Timetabled passenger services over the viaduct ended on 13 April 1931. Goods and mineral trains, with very occasional passenger excursions and diversions continued to use the line until it closed completely on 16 September 1963.

The tracks were subsequently lifted. The structure was offered for sale for £1 in 1992, but there was no initial response, as any purchaser would have to maintain and repair it, rather than demolish it and recover the stone.

Modern Times
In 2013 satellite imagery showed that the viaduct still stood.

References

Sources

External links
The line in green (search for Keekle) via Rail Map Online
The viaduct on overlain OS maps surveyed from 1898, via National Library of Scotland
The railways of Cumbria, via Cumbrian Railways Association
Photos of Cumbrian railways, via Cumbrian Railways Association
The railways of Cumbria, via Railways_of_Cumbria
Cumbrian Industrial History, via Cumbria Industrial History Society
Furness Railtour using many West Cumberland lines 5 September 1954, via sixbellsjunction
A video tour-de-force of the region's closed lines, via cumbriafilmarchive
The viaduct and Keekle Terrace, via flickr
[https://www.youtube.com/watch?v=M_1fsDwh4yk

Railway viaducts in Cumbria
Former railway bridges in the United Kingdom